Pandravilai or Eazhur Pandaravilai is a village in Eral Taluk in Tuticorin District. It is part of Perungulam town panchayat and comes under Eral Police border within Srivaikundam constituency.

History 
This village has seven huge streets, explaining its name, Eazhur Pandaravilai (ஏழூர் பண்டாரவிளை).

Economy 
This village is famous for its traditional orthopedic and Siddha Varma medical work. This traditional medical method has been followed for more than 100 years. Practitioners spread throughout Tamilnadu.

Culture 
Hindu and Christianity are the major religions. It has three Christian churches (2 CSI Churches, 1 Apostolic Church) and multiple temples.

Facilities 
 
This village has a Government Primary Health Center. 

The village hosts 3 schools (2 middle and 1 primary).

The village has two banks.

Geography 
On the north side Pandaravilai is surrounded by a pond called Perungulam. It is located in 30 KM towards South from District headquarters Thoothukudi. 646 KM from State capital Chennai. The nearby villages are Pannaivilai, Perungulam, Nattathi, Sawyerpuram.

Notables 

 Ex. Minister of Tamilnadu Legislative Assembly in ADMK Party, S.P. Shanmuganathan. 

 Bishop of Thoothukudi-Nazareth Diocese, Rt. Rev. Dr. S.E.C. Devasahayam

Transport

Railway stations 

 Kurumbur- 13.4 Km
 Tiruchendur- 26.7 Km
 Tuticorin- 27.6 Km

Airport 

 Tuticorin- 16,9 Km

References 

Villages in Thoothukudi district